The Palaeomerycidae are an extinct family of ruminants in the order Artiodactyla. Palaeomerycids lived in North America, Europe, Africa and Asia from 33 to 4.9 million years ago (from the Late Eocene to Pliocene epochs), existing for about 28 million years; one species was also reported from South America, but its identity as a palaeomerycid was subsequently disputed.

Specimens of Amphitragulus, the earliest known genus, have been found in Aragon (Spain), Ronheim (Germany), Sardinia (Italy), France, and Kazakhstan and range from 33 to 15.97 million years old. Fossils of Lagomeryx and Palaeomeryx feignouxi were recovered in Germany and Slovakia from the Middle Eocene.

The oldest known North American specimen, Barbouromeryx, was discovered in Scotts Bluff, Nebraska, and estimated at 23.03 million years old. Palaeomerycids such as Cranioceras and other Dromomerycinae continued to live in North America until the early Pliocene.

Description

One of the first known members of this group, Palaeomeryx, was thought to be a hornless form distantly related to the Giraffidae before paleontologist Miguel Crusafont found remains of Triceromeryx in middle Miocene Spain. This Palaeomeryx-like form carried two ossicones over its orbits that were straight and short, similar to those of true giraffids. However, the most striking feature of Triceromeryx was the third, Y-shaped appendage that prolonged the occipital bone at the back of the skull. Discoveries during the 1980s and 1990s showed a surprising variety in these occipital appendages.

Ampelomeryx, a genus of palaeomerycids found at the early Miocene site of Els Casots, Valles-Penedes Basin, Spain, had a three-horned system of appendages similar to those of Triceromeryx.

Another species of Triceromeryx, T. conquensis found in La Retama in Spain, showed an even more spectacular appendage — instead of a Y-shaped structure, its posterior appendage was T-shaped with the lateral branches expanding toward the front.

In primitive members of the group (e.g. Ampelomeryx), this appendage was a posterior expansion of the occipital bone lying close to the powerful muscles supporting the skull in a normal position, thus suggesting that this appendage was actually used for fighting between males during the breeding season. The reduced shapes of the flat and laterally oriented appendages of later species suggests that these were not used in active fighting, instead forming a function of passive display.

The limbs were more similar to those of modern large bovids (e.g. buffaloes) than to those of okapis. They probably lived in boggy forests, living on soft leaves and aquatic plants (as hinted to by the brachydont teeth, which are similar to those of primitive giraffids). Their diets consisted of coarse plant material.

As a group, the palaeomerycids appear to have formed a successful part of an independent radiation of horned ruminants that diversified into a variety of forms during the early to middle Miocene, with a geographic range reaching from Spain to China. The giraffids seem to have originated in Asia south of the Alpine belt, while the cervoids seem to have originated north of the Alpine belt.

Taxonomy

The Palaeomerycidae were named by Lydekker (1883). The type genus is Palaeomeryx. The family was assigned to the Artiodactyla by Hulbert and Whitmore (2006), and to Cervoidea by Carroll (1988), Sach and Heizmann (2001) and Prothero and Liter (2007).

Classification
Amphitragulus
Dromomerycinae
Asiagenes
Aletomerycini
Sinclairomeryx
Aletomeryx
Surameryx? – interpretation as a palaeomerycid disputed
Diabolocornis
Dromomerycini
Drepanomeryx
Rakomeryx
Dromomeryx
Subdromomeryx
Cranioceratini
Barbouromeryx
Bouromeryx
Procranioceras
Cranioceras
Pediomeryx
Yumaceras

Palaeomerycinae
Ampelomeryx
Palaeomeryx
Triceromeryx
Xenokeryx

Genus Lagomeryx (together with its proposed subfamily Lagomerycinae) may be a further member of this family, as well as Ligeromeryx and Stephanocemas (formerly classified as members of Cervidae).

References

External links

 
Eocene first appearances
Miocene extinctions
Prehistoric mammal families
Pecora